Gerben Thijssen (born 21 June 1998) is a Belgian road and track cyclist, who currently rides for UCI WorldTeam .

Career
Thijssen won the bronze medal at the 2015 UCI Juniors Track World Championships in the points race. He won the silver medal at the 2016–17 UCI Track Cycling World Cup in Apeldoorn in the team pursuit. In 2016, as a junior he won 2 stages in the Nations Cup Trofeo Karlsberg, the Omloop van de Vlaamse Gewesten and a Belgian Cup stage in Nederhasselt. He represented Belgium at the UCI Juniors Road World Championships in Qatar. In 2017, as a U23-rider he won the Grote Prijs Stad Sint-Niklaas and a stage in Olympia's Tour. He won the gold medal at the 2017 UEC European Track Championships in the Elite Elimination Race. In 2018, he was the Belgian champion in the U23-category. In November 2019, Thijssen crashed out of the Six Days of Ghent, suffering three small brain haemorrhages before being admitted to intensive care.

In October 2020, he was named in the startlist for the 2020 Vuelta a España.

Major results

2016
 National Junior Track Championships
1st  Omnium
1st  Points
 1st Six Days of Ghent U23 (with Jules Hesters)
 1st Omloop der Vlaamse Gewesten
 Trofeo Karlsberg
1st Stages 1 & 2a
 1st Stage 1 Internationale Cottbuser Junioren-Etappenfahrt
2017
 1st  Elimination, UEC European Track Championships
 1st Grote Prijs Stad Sint-Niklaas
 1st Stage 4 Olympia's Tour
 2nd Gooikse Pijl
 3rd Paris–Tours Espoirs
 7th Ronde van Overijssel
 7th Eschborn-Frankfurt City Loop U23
2018
 1st  Road race, National Under-23 Road Championships
 5th Paris–Troyes
2019
 1st Memorial Van Coningsloo
 1st Stage 1 Paris–Arras Tour
 4th Overall Tour d'Eure-et-Loir 
1st  Young rider classification
1st Stage 2
 6th Road race, UEC European Under-23 Road Championships
2020
 2nd Gooikse Pijl
2021
 3rd Omloop van het Houtland 
 5th Grand Prix de Fourmies
2022
 1st Gooikse Pijl
 1st Stage 2 Tour de Pologne
 1st Stage 6 Four Days of Dunkirk
 2nd Veenendaal–Veenendaal Classic
 3rd Grote Prijs Marcel Kint
 4th Grote Prijs Jean-Pierre Monseré
 5th Bredene Koksijde Classic
 7th Antwerp Port Epic
 7th Kampioenschap van Vlaanderen
 9th Omloop van het Houtland
2023
 1st Bredene Koksijde Classic
 1st Grote Prijs Jean-Pierre Monseré
 8th Albert Achterhes Profronde van Drenthe

Grand Tour general classification results timeline

References

External links

1998 births
Living people
Belgian male cyclists
Belgian track cyclists
Sportspeople from Genk
Cyclists from Limburg (Belgium)
Cyclists at the 2019 European Games
European Games competitors for Belgium